Phoenix Mecano AG is a Swiss technology company based in Stein am Rhein. The company manufactures enclosures and components for industrial uses and is divided into three divisions – DewertOkin Technology Group, Industrial Components and Enclosure Systems. Phoenix Mecano is present at more than 60 locations worldwide and has major production sites and development centres in Germany, Hungary, Tunisia, India and China. In 2022, the company employed around 8,000 people worldwide and generated sales of 793 million Euro.  Founded in 1975, Phoenix Mecano has been listed on the SIX Swiss Exchange since 1988.

References

Companies listed on the SIX Swiss Exchange
Electronics companies of Switzerland
Electrical equipment manufacturers
Swiss brands
Stein am Rhein